The 2022 season was D.C. United's 27th in existence and their 27th consecutive season in the top division of American soccer, Major League Soccer. In addition to MLS, D.C. United participated in this season's editions of the U.S. Open Cup. United also participated in the Coachella Valley Invitational and the Capital Cup friendly tournaments. The season covered the period from 1 December 2021 to 30 November 2022.

During this season, United had a poor run of form, finishing in last place for the fourth time in franchise history, the third time with Dave Kasper as General Manager or President, and the second time with Jason Levien as owner. During the season, United broke their club record for the most goals conceded during a season (75), largest home loss (6 goals), and largest away loss (7 goals). 

During the season, there were several notable departures from United including Paul Arriola, Julian Gressel, Kevin Paredes, and Frédéric Brillant. The club brought in David Ochoa, Christian Benteke, Taxiarchis Fountas, and Martín Rodríguez.

Club

Team management

Roster

Non-competitive

Preseason exhibitions

Coachella Valley Invitational

Midseason exhibitions

Competitive

Major League Soccer

Standings

Results summary

Results by matchday

Results

U.S. Open Cup

Transfers

Transfers in

Transfers out

Loan in

Loan out

MLS SuperDraft picks

Statistics

Appearances and goals 
Numbers after plus-sign(+) denote appearances as a substitute.

|-

|-
!colspan="12"|Players who left during the season
|-

|-
!colspan="4"|Total
!36!!39!!34!!36!!2!!3!!0!!0

Top scorers 
{| class="wikitable" style="font-size: 100%; text-align: center;"
|-
! style="background:#000000; color:#FFFFFF; border:2px solid #E32526; width:35px;" scope="col"|Rank
! style="background:#000000; color:#FFFFFF; border:2px solid #E32526; width:35px;" scope="col"|Position
! style="background:#000000; color:#FFFFFF; border:2px solid #E32526; width:35px;" scope="col"|No.
! style="background:#000000; color:#FFFFFF; border:2px solid #E32526; width:140px;" scope="col"|Name
! style="background:#000000; color:#FFFFFF; border:2px solid #E32526; width:75px;" scope="col"|
! style="background:#000000; color:#FFFFFF; border:2px solid #E32526; width:75px;" scope="col"|
! style="background:#000000; color:#FFFFFF; border:2px solid #E32526; width:75px;" scope="col"|
! style="background:#000000; color:#FFFFFF; border:2px solid #E32526; width:75px;" scope="col"|Total
|-
| 1 || MF || 11 ||align="left"|  || 12 || 0 || 0 || 12
|-
| 2 || FW || 9 ||align="left"|  Ola Kamara || 9 || 2 || 0 || 11
|-
| 3 || FW || 7 ||align="left"|  Michael Estrada || 4 || 0 || 0 || 4
|-
|rowspan="3"| 4 || DF || 15 || align="left"|  Steve Birnbaum || 2 || 0 || 0 || 2
|-
| MF || 49 ||align="left"| Ravel Morrison || 2 || 0 || 0 || 2
|-
| FW || 19 ||align="left"|  Nigel Robertha || 1 || 1 || 0 || 2
|-
|rowspan="6"| 7 || FW || 20 ||align="left"| Christian Benteke || 1 || 0 || 0 || 1
|-
| MF || 6 ||align="left"|  Russell Canouse || 1 || 0 || 0 || 1
|-
| MF || 8 ||align="left"|  Chris Durkin || 1 || 0 || 0 || 1
|-
| FW || 26 ||align="left"|  Kristian Fletcher || 1 || 0 || 0 || 1
|-
| MF || 10 ||align="left"|  Edison Flores || 1 || 0 || 0 || 1
|-
| FW || 17 ||align="left"|  Kimarni Smith || 1 || 0 || 0 || 1
|-
!colspan="4"|Total
!35!!3!!0!!38

Top assists 
{| class="wikitable" style="font-size: 100%; text-align: center;"
|-
! style="background:#000000; color:#FFFFFF; border:2px solid #E32526; width:35px;" scope="col"|Rank
! style="background:#000000; color:#FFFFFF; border:2px solid #E32526; width:35px;" scope="col"|Position
! style="background:#000000; color:#FFFFFF; border:2px solid #E32526; width:35px;" scope="col"|No.
! style="background:#000000; color:#FFFFFF; border:2px solid #E32526; width:140px;" scope="col"|Name
! style="background:#000000; color:#FFFFFF; border:2px solid #E32526; width:75px;" scope="col"|
! style="background:#000000; color:#FFFFFF; border:2px solid #E32526; width:75px;" scope="col"|
! style="background:#000000; color:#FFFFFF; border:2px solid #E32526; width:75px;" scope="col"|
! style="background:#000000; color:#FFFFFF; border:2px solid #E32526; width:75px;" scope="col"|Total
|-
| 1 || MF || 31 ||align="left"| Julian Gressel || 7 || 0 || 0 || 7
|-
| 2 || MF || 8 ||align="left"| Chris Durkin || 6 || 0 || 0 || 6
|-
| 3 || FW || 7 ||align="left"| Michael Estrada || 4 || 0 || 0 || 4
|-
|rowspan="4"| 4 || MF || 11 ||align="left"| || 3 || 0 || 0 || 3
|-
| FW || 19 ||align="left"| Nigel Robertha || 3 || 0 || 0 || 3
|-
| FW || 77 ||align="left"| Martín Rodríguez || 3 || 0 || 0 || 3
|-
| FW || 17 ||align="left"| Kimarni Smith || 3 || 0 || 0 || 3
|-
|rowspan="3"| 8 || DF || 14 ||align="left"| Andy Najar || 2 || 0 || 0 || 2
|-
| MF || 12 ||align="left"| Drew Skundrich || 2 || 0 || 0 || 2
|-
| FW || 9 ||align="left"| Ola Kamara || 1 || 1 || 0 || 2
|-
|rowspan="7"| 11 || DF || 93 ||align="left"| Tony Alfaro || 1 || 0 || 0 || 1
|-
| MF || 6 ||align="left"| Russell Canouse || 1 || 0 || 0 || 1
|-
| MF || 13 ||align="left"| Sofiane Djeffal|| 1 || 0 || 0 || 1
|-
| DF || 4 ||align="left"| Brendan Hines-Ike || 1 || 0 || 0 || 1
|-
|| MF || 25 ||align="left"| Jackson Hopkins || 1 || 0 || 0 || 1
|-
| DF || 23 ||align="left"| Donovan Pines || 1 || 0 || 0 || 1
|-
| DF || 5 ||align="left"| Brad Smith || 1 || 0 || 0 || 1
|-
!colspan="4"|Total
!40!!1!!0!!41

Disciplinary record 
{| class="wikitable" style="font-size: 100%; text-align:center;"
|-
| rowspan="2" !width=15|
| rowspan="2" !width=15|
| rowspan="2" !width=120|Player
| colspan="3"|MLS
| colspan="3"|U.S. Open Cup
| colspan="3"|MLS Cup
| colspan="3"|Total
|-
!width=34; background:#fe9;|
!width=34; background:#fe9;|
!width=34; background:#ff8888;|
!width=34; background:#fe9;|
!width=34; background:#fe9;|
!width=34; background:#ff8888;|
!width=34; background:#fe9;|
!width=34; background:#fe9;|
!width=34; background:#ff8888;|
!width=34; background:#fe9;|
!width=34; background:#fe9;|
!width=34; background:#ff8888;|
|-
| 4 || DF ||align="left"| Brendan Hines-Ike || 1 || 0 || 0 || 0 || 0 || 0 || 0 || 0 || 0 || 1 || 0 || 0
|-
| 5 || DF ||align="left"| Brad Smith || 1 || 0 || 0 || 0 || 0 || 0 || 0 || 0 || 0 || 1 || 0 || 0
|-
| 11 || FW ||align="left"| Michael Estrada || 1 || 0 || 0 || 0 || 0 || 0 || 0 || 0 || 0 || 1 || 0 || 0
|-
| 14 || DF ||align="left"| Andy Najar || 1 || 0 || 0 || 0 || 0 || 0 || 0 || 0 || 0 || 1 || 0 || 0
|-
| 16 || FW ||align="left"| Adrien Perez || 1 || 0 || 0 || 0 || 0 || 0 || 0 || 0 || 0 || 1 || 0 || 0
|-
| 27 || MF ||align="left"| Moses Nyeman || 0 || 0 || 1 || 0 || 0 || 0 || 0 || 0 || 0 || 0 || 0 || 1
|-
!colspan=3|Total !!5!!0!!1!!0!!0!!0!!0!!0!!0!!5!!0!!1

Clean sheets
{| class="wikitable sortable" style="text-align: center;"
|-
! style="background:#000000; color:#FFFFFF; border:2px solid #E32526; width:35px;" scope="col"|No.
! style="background:#000000; color:#FFFFFF; border:2px solid #E32526; width:160px;" scope="col"|Name
! style="background:#000000; color:#FFFFFF; border:2px solid #E32526; width:50px;" scope="col"|
! style="background:#000000; color:#FFFFFF; border:2px solid #E32526; width:50px;" scope="col"|
! style="background:#000000; color:#FFFFFF; border:2px solid #E32526; width:50px;" scope="col"|
! style="background:#000000; color:#FFFFFF; border:2px solid #E32526; width:50px;" scope="col"|Total
! style="background:#000000; color:#FFFFFF; border:2px solid #E32526; width:50px;" scope="col"|Games
|-
| 1 ||  || 1 || 0 || 0 || 1 || 14
|-
| 21 ||  || 0 || 1 || 0 || 1 || 4
|-
| 28 ||  || 2 || 0 || 0 || 2 || 10
|-
| 32 ||  || 2 || 0 || 0 || 2 || 9
|-

See also 
 2022 Loudoun United FC season

References

External links 
 D.C. United

 

D.C. United seasons
Dc United
Dc United
2022 in sports in Washington, D.C.